Clément-Garrard was a popular motorised cycle from 1902 that was manufactured in Birmingham, Great Britain, under licence from Adolphe Clément-Bayard's Clément-Gladiator industrial empire.

James Lansdowne Norton built Clément bicycle frames under licence, and used the Clément clip-on engine for his first Norton motorcycles.

See also
 Adolphe Clément-Bayard#Motor manufacturing
 Garrard & Blumfield

References

Defunct motor vehicle manufacturers of England
Vehicle manufacturing companies established in 1902
Defunct companies based in Birmingham, West Midlands
Vintage vehicles
Brass Era vehicles